Murrayfield railway station served the area of Murrayfield, Edinburgh, Scotland from 1879 to 1962 on the Leith Branch.

History
The station opened on 1 August 1879 by the Caledonian Railway. There was a large goods yard as well as Coltbridge Stone Depot. Two signal boxes were built, one to the north of the southbound platform and the other to the southwest. These were later removed and replaced by a single box to the northwest, next to the goods yard. It was downgraded to a ground frame in 1944. The station closed on 30 April 1962.

References

External links 

Disused railway stations in Edinburgh
Former Caledonian Railway stations
Railway stations in Great Britain opened in 1879
Railway stations in Great Britain closed in 1962
1879 establishments in Scotland
1962 disestablishments in Scotland